Silence is a 1926 American silent crime drama film directed by Rupert Julian and starring Vera Reynolds, H.B. Warner, and Raymond Hatton. Reynolds plays a dual role of a mother and, at a later date, her daughter. Long thought lost, a print was rediscovered in 2016.

The film's sets were designed by the art director Max Parker.

Cast

Preservation
Prints of Silence are located in the Archives du Film du CNC at Bois d'Arcy and the Cinémathèque Française in Paris.

References

Bibliography
 Goble, Alan. The Complete Index to Literary Sources in Film. Walter de Gruyter, 1999.

External links

1926 films
1926 crime drama films
American silent feature films
American crime drama films
Films directed by Rupert Julian
American black-and-white films
Producers Distributing Corporation films
1920s English-language films
1920s American films
Silent American drama films